Rollington Town is a neighborhood in the area of Kingston, Jamaica. Part of it is in Kingston Parish. A campus of Kingston College is in Rollington Town.

Notable events 
In 2017 Jamaica Urban Transit Company (JUTC) suspended service on a line through Rollington Town because of road blocks and violence. The company's buses had been attacked by stone throwers. Service was restored the next day.

Oku Onuora formed a community school in the area and organized in the area. He distributed Abeng and was arrested in Rollington Town. Scholar and activist Walter Rodney was also active in the area.

Notable residents 
Boris Gardiner was born in Rollington Town. Ken Rickards, Sadiki, and Connie Mark are also from Rollington Town. Cricketers Chris Gayle and Irvin Iffla is also from Rollington Town.

Cultural references 
Trevor D. Rhone's play Two Can Play is set in Rollington Town.

References

Neighbourhoods in Kingston, Jamaica